Khashayar Mostafavi (born 1982) is an Iranian-German writer and filmmaker.

Biography
Khashayar Mostafavi finished his undergraduate studies in performance arts in University of Tehran and received his Masters in Directing from Tarbiat Modares University of Tehran. In addition to directing several plays in Tehran, he has directed two feature-length political documentaries, Our Cherry Orchard and Fight Me, and several other short films. They were broadcast on international media such as BBC and VOA. Mostafavi has also written four books: Birth of Iranian Drama, To Hell (a collection of short stories), Sex, Anarchism and Cruelty In Panic Theater of Mr Arrabal, and The Days Slowly (three screenplays). After the publication of Birth of Iranian Drama, Mostafavi was accused of insulting Islamic sanctities and had to emigrate from Iran to Germany under pressure from the Iranian Ministry of Intelligence and Security. Mostafavi's  feature film, Being There (Dasein), which discuss the problems of immigrants, is in German. Being There first screened at the 20th Shanghai International Film Festival. He has lived in Germany since 2013 and works for NDR Fernsehen. His latest film The truth and nothing but the truth  is a filmmaker researches the complex network of money laundering and the ideological expansion of the Islamic Republic of Iran in Germany. He comes across a member of the Iranian Revolutionary Guards who lives in Hamburg in the guise of a businessman. The film tells the story of the filmmaker’s three-year journey to reveal his true identity.

Works

Books/Publications
 
 
 To Hell, Gardon Publication, Berlin, Germany, 2013 .

Filmography

References

External links

 List of Mostafavi's published books
 Khashayar Mostafavi's biography
"Youtube"

Iranian writers
1982 births
Living people
University of Tehran alumni
Tarbiat Modares University alumni
Iranian film directors
Iranian documentary filmmakers
Persian-language writers
People from Tehran